Joseph Wirtz (5 January 1912 – 12 September 1991) was a French athlete. He competed in the men's hammer throw at the 1936 Summer Olympics.

References

1912 births
1991 deaths
Athletes (track and field) at the 1936 Summer Olympics
French male hammer throwers
Olympic athletes of France